The 1961–62 Serie A season was the 28th season of the Serie A, the top level of ice hockey in Italy. Four teams participated in the league, and SG Cortina won the championship.

Regular season

External links
 Season on hockeytime.net

1961–62 in Italian ice hockey
Serie A (ice hockey) seasons
Italy